Greendale is an unincorporated community in Valley Township, Armstrong County, Pennsylvania, United States.

History
A post office called Greendale was established in 1867. It remained in operation until 1905. Greendale P.O. appears in the 1876 Atlas of Armstrong County, Pennsylvania.

References

Unincorporated communities in Armstrong County, Pennsylvania
Unincorporated communities in Pennsylvania